Aboubacar Sidiki Kouyaté (born 3 November 1998) is an Ivorian footballer who plays as a defender for Saint-Étienne B.

Career

Before the 2018 season, Kouyaté signed for San Martín in Peru after playing for the reserves of French Ligue 1 side Monaco, where he made 10 league appearances and scored 0 goals.

Before the second half of 2019/20, he signed for the reserves of Saint-Étienne in the French Ligue 1.

References

External links
 
 

Ivorian footballers
Ivorian expatriate footballers
Expatriate footballers in Peru
Championnat National 2 players
Living people
Ivorian expatriate sportspeople in France
Expatriate footballers in France
1998 births
Association football defenders
Club Deportivo Universidad de San Martín de Porres players
Peruvian Primera División players